The South Korean boyband VIXX have embarked on six concert tours under the title of VIXX Live Fantasia, namely "Hex Sign" in 2014, "Utopia" in 2015, "Elysium" in 2016, "Daydream" in 2017, "Lost Fantasia" in 2018 and ultimately "Parallel" in 2019. They have also held four showcases, the most notable being their debut showcase tour "The Milky Way Global Showcase" and two fan meetings.

The Milky Way Global Showcase (2013) 

The Milky Way Global Showcase (stylized as VIXX Global Showcase ‘The Milky Way’), is the debut live showcase tour by South Korean boy band, VIXX. The tour, organized by Jazzy Group, was held from October 20 to November 17, 2013, in Kuala Lumpur, Osaka, Tokyo, Stockholm, Milan, Dallas, Los Angeles and Seoul.

History
The tour was officially announced by the band on August 23, 2013, via their official Daum fancafe. VIXX also teased the tour with a video uploaded to their official YouTube account. The title of the showcase, "The Milky Way" is in reference to their fans (Starlights) all over the world representing the stars that comprise the entire galaxy The Milky Way. The showcase took place over the course of just two months, October and November.

Set list
This setlist is representative of encore show held in Seoul, South Korea on November 17, 2013.
Main Set

 "On and On"
 "Light Up the Darkness"
 "Hyde"
 "Only U"
 "In the Name of Love" (Ken solo)
 Hongbin & Hyuk stage (Special Joint Stage)
 "껄렁껄렁" (Ravi solo)
 "Please" (Lee So-ra cover) (Leo solo)
 "LoveStoned" (N Solo Dance Stage)
 "Voodoo Doll" (Preview)
 "I Got a Boy + So Hot + 24 Hours" (Special Dance Stage)
 "Love Letter"
 "Super Hero"
 "Rock Ur Body"

Encore
 "Hyde" (Acoustic Remix Version)
 "G.R.8.U"

Tour dates

Media
Television Broadcast

VIXX Live Fantasia — Hex Sign (2014) 

VIXX Live Fantasia – Hex Sign, simply known as VIXX Live Fantasia is the first solo concert and world tour by South Korean boy band, VIXX. The tour, produced by CJ E&M Music and Live and Jellyfish Entertainment will officially launch with VIXX's first three concerts from July 18–20 in Seoul.

History
VIXX's agency, Jellyfish Entertainment announced on May 30, "VIXX will be holding a two-day solo concert VIXX Live Fantasia – Hex Sign on July 19 and 20. VIXX will also be performing solo concerts in Japan, making its way to a world tour."

A content business team from CJ E&M Music and Live (which will be co-producing the concert with Jellyfish) stated, "Presenting its first solo concert since debut, VIXX has been working hard in order to present the visuals and performances that it has never before shown on broadcasts or stages. As the group has differentiated from other idol groups with its vampire or Jekyll and Hyde concepts, we will be presenting a concert reminding one of a fantasy world for 150 minutes."

In response to speedy fans who snatched up all the tickets for VIXX's upcoming first solo concert within 9 minutes, VIXX has added another date to their Seoul concert for July 18, which sold out within 10 minutes. Priority ticket sales for VIXX's official fanclub began on Auction Ticket on June 9 at 8 PM KST, and it was reported that the site crashed as fans rushed to grab the 7,000 tickets for each of the two concert dates. Within 9 minutes, the tickets had all sold out. According to CJ E&M Music and Live on the 13th, the additional concert date on July 18 also sold out within 10 minutes of ticket sales, showcasing how much fans want to go see VIXX live.

Set list
This setlist is representative of first two shows held in Seoul, South Korea on July 18 and 19, 2014.
Main Set

 "Voodoo Doll" 
 "Secret Night"
 "Hyde"
 "Beautiful Killer"
 "CHAOS"
 "B.O.D.Y"
 "Only U"
 "Love, LaLaLa"
 "A Cold Night" (Leo & Ken stage)
 "Memory" {Ravi & Hyuk stage}
 "Toxic" (N & Hongbin dance stage)
 "Light Up the Darkness"
 "Someday"
 "Love Letter"
 "Starlight"
 "UUUUU"
 "From Now On, You're Mine"
 "Rock Ur Body"
 "Thank You for Being Born"

Encore
 "Super Hero"
 "G.R.8.U"

Encore 2
 "On and On"
<li value="22"

Tour dates

VIXX US Tour (2014)
VIXX US Tour, simply known as MUSICENKOR Presents: VIXX. The tour, organized by Limelight Entertainment was held on November 22 and November 23, 2014 in Chicago at Star Plaza Theater and in New York City at Terminal 5.

VIXX Live Fantasia — Utopia (2015)

VIXX Live Fantasia — Utopia is the second solo concert and world tour by South Korean boy band, VIXX. The tour, produced by CJ E&M Music and Live and Jellyfish Entertainment will officially launch with VIXX's first two concerts from March 28 and 29 in Seoul at the Olympic Gymnastics Arena.

Set list

 Prologue: Missing Child
 Opening: The Parade of Black X
 "On and On"
 "Voodoo Doll" 
 "Light Up the Darkness"
 "Secret Night"
 Bridge Performance: Surgery
 "Cloning" (Hongbin Dance Solo)
 "Ghost" (Ravi Solo)
 "After Dark"
 "Youth Hurts"
 "Say U Say Me"
 Lets Learn About Human Emotions VCR
 "Call You Mine" (Jeff Bernat Cover) (Hyuk Solo) 
 "Rolling in the Deep" (Adele Cover) (Ken Solo)
 "CHAOS"
 "Time Machine"
 "Rock Ur Body"
 "Love Letter" 
 "Someday"
 "Sad Ending"
 Bridge Performance: Mother
 "Words to Say" (Leo Solo)
 "Self-Disunion" (N Dance Solo)
 "Hyde"
 "Beautiful Killer" 
 "Eternity"
 Ending Video: End of the World
 "Error"

Encore
 "Starlight" 
 "Love Equation"
 "From Now On, You’re Mine"
 "G.R.8.U"

Tour dates

DVD
A Live Recording of Utopia concert in Seoul was released on DVD on October 1, 2015. It contained two discs and had subtitles in Korean, English and Chinese.

 Prologue: Missing Child
 Opening: The Parade of Black X
 다칠 준비가 돼 있어
 저주인형 (Voodoo Doll)
 어둠 속을 밝혀줘 (Light Up The Darkness/Light Me Up)
 Secret Night
 Bridge Performance: Surgery
 Cloning (Hongbin Solo)
 Ghost (Ravi Solo)
 After Dark
 청춘이 아파 (Youth Hurts)
 Say U Say Me
 Bridge Video: Feeling
 CHAOS
 Time Machine
 Rock Ur Body
 Love Letter
 Someday
 Sad Ending
 Bridge Performance: Mother
 할 말 (Leo Solo)
 Self-Disunion (N Solo)
 hyde
 Beautiful Killer
 Eternity (기적)
 Ending Video: End of the World
 Error

 ENCORE STARLIGHT
 이별공식 (Love Equation)
 오늘부터 내 여자 (From Now On, You're Mine)
 대.다.나.다.너 (GR8U)

VIXX Japan Live Tour – Depend On (2016)

Tour dates

VIXX Live Fantasia — Elysium (2016) 

VIXX Live Fantasia — Elysium is the third solo concert by South Korean boy band, VIXX.

Set list

 "Chained Up" 
 "Light Up the Darkness" 
 "Secret Night"

FIRST MENT (Introduction)

 "Spider" 
 "Maze" 
 "After Dark" 
 "Hot Enough" 
 "Bad Bye"

SECOND MENT

Ken's solo
Leo's solo
 "DamnRa" (Ravi's solo)

VCR
 "Fantasy"
 "Love Me Do"
 "Ain't No Sunshine" (Hongbin's solo) (Bill Withers)
 "Because I Love You" (Hyuk's Solo) (Yoo Jaeha)
 N's solo Contemporary Dance
 "My Light"
 "Someday"
 "Us Now"
 "On and On"
 "Voodoo Doll"
 "Hyde"

THIRD MENT

 "Error"

Encore
 "Eternity"
 "Dynamite"
 "Love Equation"
 "Heaven"

Tour dates

DVD
A Live Recording of Elysium concert in Seoul was released on DVD on March 7, 2017. It contained two discs and had subtitles in Korean, English and Chinese.

 사슬 (Chained Up)
 어둠 속을 밝혀줘 (Light Me Up)
 Secret Night
 Spider
 MAZE
 After Dark
 Hot Enough
 손의 이별 (Badbye)
 SOLO #1 [Ken] – 잠 못드는 밤에
 SOLO #2 [Leo] – Trap
 SOLO #3 [Ravi] – DamnRa
 Fantasy
 Love Me Do
 SOLO #4 [Hongbin] – Ain't No Sunshine 
 SOLO #5 [Hyuk] – 사랑하기 때문에
 SOLO #6 [N] – Destroy humanity
 My Light
 Someday
 지금 우린 (Us Now)
 다칠 준비가 돼 있어 (On And On)
 저주 인형 (Voodoo Doll)
 hyde

 Error
 기적 (Eternity)
 다이너마이트 (Dynamite)
<li value="26"> 이별공식 (Love Equation)
<li value="27"> Heaven
 CONCERT POSTER & VCR Making Film
 CONCERT Making Film
 VIXX LIVE FANTASIA ELYSIUM Multi Angle [Fantasy] N/ LEO/ KEN/ RAVI/ HONGBIN/ HYUK

VIXX Live Fantasia — Daydream (2017) 

VIXX Live Fantasia — Daydream (literal name: "백일몽") is the fourth solo concert by South Korean boy band, VIXX. The concert, produced by CJ E&M Music and Live and Jellyfish Entertainment took place from May 12, 2017 to May 14, 2017 at Jamsil Arena in Seoul and in Busan on June 11, 2017, South Korea. The remaining four concerts were planned and executed at Japanese cities: in Nagoya on July 11, 2017, Tokyo on July 15, 2017 and lastly Osaka on July 23 and July 24, 2017.

Set lists 

 "Fantasy" 
 "Desperate" 
 "Six Feet Under"

FIRST MENT (Introduction)

<li value="4"> "Dynamite" 
<li value="5"> "B.O.D.Y." 
<li value="6"> "Good Night & Good Morning" 
<li value="7"> "Romance Has Ended" 
<li value="8"> "Sad Ending"

SECOND MENT

<li value="9"> "Lie Lie Lie" (Hongbin's solo)
<li value="10"> "SO ROMANTIC" (Ken's solo)
<li value="11"> "HUG U" (Hyuk's solo)
<li value="12"> "Shangri-La"
<li value="13"> "Blackout"

THIRD MENT

<li value="14"> "Thank You For Being Born" + fan surprise event
<li value="15"> "Up In The Sky" (Leo's solo)
<li value="16"> Contemporary Dance to "Fate" (N's Solo)
<li value="17"> "Hong gil dong" (Ravi's Solo)

VCR

<li value="18"> "On and On"
<li value="19"> "Hyde"

FOURTH MENT

<li value="20"> "The Closer"
<li value="21"> "Love Me Do"
<li value="21"> "Chained Up"

FIFTH MENT
<li value="22"> "Eternity"
<li value="23"> "Voodoo Doll"

Encore
<li value="24"> "STARLIGHT"
<li value="25"> "Time Machine"
<li value="26"> "Shooting Star"
<li value="27"> "Heaven"

VCR
 "Fantasy" 
 "Desperate"

FIRST MENT (Introduction)

<li value="3"> "Dynamite" 
<li value="4"> "B.O.D.Y."

VCR

<li value="5"> "Good Night & Good Morning" 
<li value="7"> "Romance Has Ended" 
<li value="8"> "The Closer"
<li value="9"> "Love Me Do"

VCR

<li value="10"> "Shangri-La"
<li value="11"> "Blackout"
<li value="12"> "Hanakaze" (Flower Wind)

VCR

<li value="13"> "On and On"
<li value="14"> "Chained Up" (Japanese Version)

SECOND MENT

<li value="20"> "Depend On Me"
<li value="21"> "Error" (Japanese Version)

Encore
<li value="24"> "Love Equation"
<li value="25"> "Heaven"

Tour dates

DVD
A Live Recording of Daydream concert in Seoul was released on DVD on November 17, 2017. It contained three discs and had subtitles in Korean, English and Chinese.

 OPENING VIDEO “LIGHTS FADE AWAY”
 Fantasy
 Desperate
 늪 (Six Feet Under)
 다이너마이트 (Dynamite)
 B.O.D.Y
 BRIDGE VIDEO 1 “VIXX & U”
 Good Night & Good Morning
 로맨스는 끝났다 (Romance Has Ended)
 Sad Ending
 SOLO #1 [Hongbin] 거짓말 거짓말 거짓말 ?이적 (Lie Lie Lie - Lee Juck)
 SOLO #2 [Ken] SO ROMANTIC
 SOLO #3 [Hyuk] 안아줄게 (Hug U)
 BRIDGE VIDEO 2 “IN MY DREAMS”
 도원경 (Shangri-La)
 Black Out
 태어나줘서 고마워 (Thank You For Being Born)
 Love Letter

 SOLO #4 [Leo] UP IN THE SKY
 SOLO #5 [N] 인연 ?이선희 (Fate ?Lee Sun Hee)
 SOLO #6 [Ravi] 홍길동 (Hong gil dong)
 BRIDGE VIDEO 3 “DREAMS OF STARLIGHTS.”
 다칠 준비가 돼 있어 (On and On)
 Hyde
 The Closer
 Love Me Do
 사슬 (Chained up)
 기적 (ETERNITY)
 저주인형 (Voodoo Doll)
 STARLIGHT
 Time Machine
 Shooting Star
 Heaven

 Making Of “DAY DREAM” VIDEOS
 Making Of “DAY DREAM” Seoul Concert
 Making Of “DAY DREAM” Busan Concert

VIXX Live Lost Fantasia (2018) 

VIXX Live Fantasia — Daydream (literal name: "백일몽") is the fourth solo concert by South Korean boy band, VIXX. The concert, produced by CJ E&M Music and Live and Jellyfish Entertainment took place from May 25, 2018 to May 26, 2018 at the Jamsil Arena in Seoul, South Korea and from August 24 to August 26, 2018 in Japan.

Set list 

 "Odd Sense" 
 "Escape" 
 "Silence"

FIRST MENT (Introduction)

<li value="4"> "Fantasy" 
<li value="5"> "Wild" (Ravi's solo stage)
<li value="6"> "Into The Void" 
<li value="7"> "Six Feet Under"

SECOND MENT

<li value="8"> "Trigger"
<li value="9"> "Beautiful Killer"

VCR

<li value="10"> "Allure" (Hongbin's solo stage)
<li value="11"> "Scentist" 
<li value="12"> "Allure" (Leo's solo stage)
<li value="13"> "Circle"

THIRD MENT

<li value="14"> "My Valentine" 
<li value="15"> "Love Me Do" 
<li value="16"> Allure (Hyuk's solo stage)

VCR

<li value="17"> Ballad (Ken's solo stage)
<li value="18"> Mashup
 닮아 (Resemble)
 다가오네 (1, 2, 3, 4, 5)-차 
 가운 밤에 (On a Cold Night)
 손의 이별 (Bad Bye)
<li value="19"> "Us Now"

FOURTH MENT

<li value="20"> "Chained Up"
<li value="21"> "Blackout"
<li value="22"> Conceptual (N's solo stage)
<li value="23"> "Hyde"

FIFTH MENT

<li value="24"> "Desperate"
<li value="25"> "Wind of Starlight" + "Shangri La"

ENCORE
<li value="26"> "Milky Way"
<li value="27"> "Navy & Shining

Tour dates

DVD
A live recording of Lost Fantasia concert in Seoul on DVD and Blu-ray was announced on October 2, 2018 and released on November 09, 2018. It contained 2 discs with subtitles in Korean, Englisch and Chinese. 
 Odd Sense
 Escape
 Silence
 Fantasy
 [Ravi] Interlude “WILD” STAGE 1
 Into The Void
 늪 (Six Feet Under)
 Trigger
 Beautiful Killer
 [Hongbin] Interlude “ALLURE” STAGE 2
 향 (Scentist)
 [Leo] Interlude “ALLURE” STAGE 3
 Circle
 My Valentine
 Love Me do
 [Hyuk] Interlude “ALLURE” STAGE 4
 [Ken] Interlude “BALLAD” STAGE 5
 Moments Mashup [닮아 (Resemble)-다가오네 (1, 2, 3, 4, 5)-차 # 가운 밤에 (On a Cold Night)-손의 이별 (Bad Bye)]
 지금 우린 (Us Now)

 사슬 (Chained Up)
 BLACK OUT
 [N] Interlude “CONCEPTUAL” STAGE 6
 Hyde
 Desperate
 The wind of Starlight + 도원경 (Shangri-La)
 MILKY WAY
 Navy & Shining Gold
 Heaven

 POSTER MAKING FILM
 VCR MAKING FILM
 PRACTICE MAKING FILM
 REHEARSAL MAKING FILM
 D-DAY MAKING FILM

VIXX Live Fantasia —  Parallel (2019) 

VIXX Live Fantasia — Daydream (literal name: "백일몽") is the fourth solo concert by South Korean boy band, VIXX. The concert, produced by CJ E&M Music and Live and Jellyfish Entertainment took place from September 28, 2019 to September 29, 2019 at the Jamsil Arena in Seoul, South Korea and in Japan from October 16 to 17, 2019. It was the first concert without the full number of members with leader N missing because of him attending his military service since March 4, 2019.

VIXX sub-unit's and member's solo concerts

Leo's solo concert  - CANVAS (2018) 
VIXX's Leo held a concert tour for his solo debut album CANVAS with locations in South Korea and Japan.

Tour dates

Showcases

VIXX

VIXX LR

References

External links
 VIXX  at Jellyfish Entertainment 
 VIXX Japan Official Site 

Concert tours
VIXX
Lists of concert tours of South Korean artists
VIXX
VIXX
K-pop concerts by artist